Hassan Al-Jubairi (born 6 March 1991) is a Saudi Arabian professional footballer who plays as a centre-back or right-back for Pro League side Al-Tai.

Club career
Al-Jubairi started his career playing at Awacs Jeddah in the Neighborhood Leagues. He joined Jeddah during the 2015–16 season. He spent five seasons at the club before leaving. On 27 July 2020, Al-Jubairi joined Pro League side Al-Faisaly on a three-year deal. On 25 October 2020, Al-Jubairi was loaned out to Al-Tai until the end of the 2020–21 season. He left Al-Faisaly without making a single appearance. On 1 May 2021, Al-Jubairi scored twice against Al-Diriyah to help Al-Tai come back from 2–0 down to win the match 3–2. His two goals proved to be vital as Al-Tai earned promotion to the Pro League after finishing one point ahead of rivals Al-Jabalain. On 11 July 2021, Al-Jubairi joined Al-Tai on a permanent deal. On 14 August 2021, he made his Pro League debut in a 1–0 loss against defending champions Al-Hilal.

References

External links
 
 

1991 births
Living people
Saudi Arabian footballers
Association football defenders
Association football fullbacks
Saudi Fourth Division players
Saudi Second Division players
Saudi First Division League players
Saudi Professional League players
Jeddah Club players
Al-Faisaly FC players
Al-Tai FC players